Presidential elections were held in the partially recognized Republic of Abkhazia in 2019. As no candidate gathered more than 50% of the votes in the first round 25 August, a second was held on 8 September between the top two candidates, incumbent President Raul Khajimba of the Forum for the National Unity of Abkhazia and Alkhas Kvitsinia of Amtsakhara. Khajimba was subsequently re-elected with a margin of less than 2% in the second round. On September 20, the Supreme Court in Abkhazia declared the decision of the Central Election Commission to recognize incumbent Raul Khajimba’s victory in the second round of the presidential election as legal.

In January 2020 the Abkhazian Supreme Court annulled the results, following protests against Khajimba. Khajimba resigned the presidency on 12 January, and new elections were called for 22 March.

Background
The People's Assembly had originally set a date for 21 July. In May 2019, the opposition demanded rescheduling the elections after the main opposition candidate Aslan Bzhania appeared to have been poisoned in Russia. The elections were subsequently postponed to 25 August 2019 under pressure from supporters of the Bzhania.

Candidates
Registration for candidates officially opened on 26 June 2019. Ten candidate initially registered; but it was later determined that one candidate, Astamur Otirba, had not presented a Vice-President in time.

Bzhaniya’s withdrawal from the election
Opposition leader Aslan Bzhania withdrew from the election on 15 July due to an apparent poisoning.

Results

Aftermath 
Following the second round, Alkhas Kvitsinia contested the results in court. After the elections, Khajimba re-appointed Valery Bganba as Prime Minister.

Protests against Khajimba began on 9 January 2020, and on 10 January the Abkhazian Supreme Court annulled the results of the election.

See also
List of annulled elections

References

 
Presidential elections in Abkhazia
Annulled elections
Abkhazia